Federico Cainero (born 28 July 1969) is an Italian judoka.

Achievements

See also
European Judo Championships
History of martial arts
Judo in Italy
List of judo techniques
List of judoka
Martial arts timeline

References

External links

1969 births
Living people
Italian male judoka
Place of birth missing (living people)